The 2004 World Table Tennis Championships –  women's team (Corbillon Cup) was the 40th edition of the women's team championship.

China won the gold medal defeating Hong Kong in the final 3–0. Japan won the bronze medal. 
The International Table Tennis Association introduced a new format for the second stage of the tournament.

Medalists

First stage

Group A

Group B

Final stage

Final

Final 4 bracket

See also
List of World Table Tennis Championships medalists

References

-